The 1964–65 South-West Indian Ocean cyclone season was an active cyclone season.

Systems

Tropical Disturbance Arlette

Arlette existed from December 4 to December 8.

Moderate Tropical Storm Bessie

Bessie existed from December 7 to December 11.

Moderate Tropical Storm Connie

Connie existed from December 17 to December 21.

Tropical Disturbance Doreen

Doreen existed from December 23 to December 25.

Moderate Tropical Storm Edna

Edna existed from December 22 to December 27.

Tropical Cyclone Freda

Freda existed from January 5 to January 10.

Moderate Tropical Storm Ginette

Ginette existed from January 6 to January 7.

Tropical Disturbance Hazel

Hazel existed on January 15.

Moderate Tropical Storm Iris

Iris existed from January 17 to January 28.

Moderate Tropical Storm Judy

Judy existed from February 6 to February 9.

Moderate Tropical Storm Kathleen

Kathleen existed from February 10 to February 20. Kathleen passed southeast of Rodrigues on February 16, generating high waves that reached  along the island's southern coast.

Moderate Tropical Storm Lesley

Lesley existed from February 20 to February 25.

Tropical Disturbance Maureen

Maureen existed on February 22.

Tropical Disturbance Nancy

Nancy existed on February 23.

Tropical Cyclone Gay-Olive

Olive existed from February 24 to March 10. On March 4, Olive passed south of Rodrigues as a tropical depression. It produced high seas and scattered thunderstorms as far west as Réunion.

Unknown Storm Peggy

Peggy was the sixteenth storm of the season.

Moderate Tropical Storm Rose

Rose existed from April 27 to May 6. The rains caused a landslide along the Rivière des Remparts.

See also

 Atlantic hurricane seasons: 1964, 1965
 Eastern Pacific hurricane seasons: 1964, 1965
 Western Pacific typhoon seasons: 1964, 1965
 North Indian Ocean cyclone seasons: 1964, 1965

References

South-West Indian Ocean cyclone seasons